The 2022 OFC Futsal Cup was the 13th edition of the OFC Futsal Nations Cup (previously called the OFC Futsal Championship), the international futsal championship organised by the Oceania Football Confederation (OFC) for the men's national teams of Oceania.

Solomon Islands were the defending champions, after defeating New Zealand in the 2019 final.

New Zealand took revenge on Solomon Islands by defeating them 6–2 in the final and winning the 2022 edition.

Teams
Seven of the 11 FIFA-affiliated national teams from OFC entered the tournament. Fiji Football Association were invited to enter a second team to ensure an even number of teams were participating.

Did not enter

Venue
The matches were played at the Vodafone Arena in Suva.

Squads

Draw
The draw of the tournament was held on 5 September 2022 at the OFC Home of Football in Auckland, New Zealand. The eight teams were drawn into two groups of four teams. The top two ranked teams (based of the 2019 OFC Futsal Nations Cup standings, Solomon Islands and New Zealand, were drawn into position 1 of Group A or B, and the bottom two ranked teams, FFA Presidents Five and Samoa, were drawn into position 4 of Group A or B, while the remaining teams were drawn into position 2 or 3 of Group A or B. Fiji and FFA Presidents Five were inelgible to be drawn into the same group.

Group stage
The top two teams of each group advance to the semi-finals. The bottom two teams enter the 5th–8th place play-offs.

All times are local, FJT (UTC+12).

Group A

Group B

5th–8th place play-offs

Bracket (5th–8th place)

Play-off semi-finals

Seventh place match

Fifth place match

Knockout stage

Bracket (1st–4th place)

Semi-finals

Third place match

Final

Awards
The following awards were given at the conclusion of the tournament.

Goalscorers

References

External links
OFC Futsal Nations Cup 2019
News > OFC Futsal Nations Cup 2019 , oceaniafootball.com

2022
2022 in futsal
Futsal Nations Cup
2022 OFC Futsal Cup
2022 in Fijian football
September 2022 sports events in Oceania